Velu Narayanasamy (born 30 May 1947) is an Indian politician who served as the 10th Chief Minister of Puducherry from 2016 to 2021. He is a member of Indian National Congress political party.

He previously served as Member of Parliament, representing Puducherry in the Lok Sabha. He served as a Union Minister of State in the Prime Minister's Office in the Manmohan Singh government.

In the 2014 general elections, he was defeated by the NDA candidate R. Radhakrishnan, who was backed by the ruling All India N.R. Congress. He is a member of the Congress Working Committee as well as All India Congress Committee's General Secretary.

Early life
V. Narayanasamy  was born in Pondicherry, the son of Velu, and Iswary. He did his B.A. from Tagore Arts College, Pondicherry. B.L. from Madras Law College, Chennai and M.L. from Annamalai University.

Political career

V. Narayanasamy served three tenures as Rajya Sabha MP and was a member of Lok Sabha from Puducherry constituency from 2009 to 2014. He was minister of state in Prime Minister's office in Manmohan Singh's second government as well as minister of state, Parliamentary Affairs in the first UPA government.

Chief Minister
He was named the Chief Minister of Puducherry in May 2016 after Indian National Congress and Dravida Munnetra Kazhagam alliance won Puducherry Legislative Assembly election.

He was chosen over V. Vaithilingam who was twice Chief Minister of Puducherry.

On 6 June 2016, he replaced N. Rangaswamy and was sworn in as Chief Minister of Puducherry.

On 22 February 2021, Narayanasamy resigned from the post after the Congress government lost its majority in the legislative assembly and the trust vote on floor.

See also
 V. Narayanasamy ministry

References

|-

|-

External links

 

People from Pondicherry
Indian National Congress politicians from Puducherry
Living people
1947 births
Rajya Sabha members from Puducherry
India MPs 2009–2014
Lok Sabha members from Puducherry
United Progressive Alliance candidates in the 2014 Indian general election
Chief ministers from Indian National Congress
Chief ministers of Puducherry
Puducherry MLAs 2016–2021